Anthony Joseph Palermo (born November 22, 1969) is an American musician who is the drummer of Californian rock band Papa Roach and is the former drummer of punk rock bands Pulley and Unwritten Law. He was also a touring drummer for Sixx:A.M. in summer 2008.

Musical career

Ten Foot Pole

Tony Palermo began his career as the drummer for the Los Angeles punk band Ten Foot Pole.

The Jealous Sound
Played on "Kill Them With Kindness", as well as a few tracks on their EP.

Unwritten Law

Tony Palermo was the drummer for Unwritten Law, with which he was featured on the albums, Here's to the Mourning, and The Hit List. While in Unwritten Law, he was asked to be a touring drummer for Papa Roach before becoming a full-time member.

Pulley

Palermo became the drummer for punk rock band Pulley after the departure of Jordan Burns. He has since been replaced.

Current bands

When Papa Roach drummer Dave Buckner was sent to rehab in 2007, the band asked Tony Palermo if he would be willing to play drums for the band live. During the tour, the band formed a relationship with Palermo. In January 2008, when Dave left the band for good, Papa Roach asked Tony to be the band's permanent drummer. It was the band's first line-up change since 1996, also the first since signing with a major label. Tony is featured on six of Papa Roach's albums; Metamorphosis, Time for Annihilation, The Connection, F.E.A.R., Crooked Teeth and "Who Do You Trust?". In combination as member from Papa Roach, Tony was also a touring drummer for Sixx:A.M. while the band was on the Crüe Fest tour along with Papa Roach.

Equipment
Drums (Pearl Masterworks in Black Sparkle 6 ply Maple shells)

 26x16 kick drum (x2)
 14x9 rack tom
 16x14 floor tom
 18x14 floor tom
 14x6.5 Ultracast snare

Cymbals (Sabian AAX and Paragon)

Paiste cymbals (late 1990s-2011)

2002 18" novo china 
2002 14" heavy hi-hats 
Signature 19" power crash 
Signature 20" power crash 
2002 22" power ride 
Signature 20" power crash 
2002 22" crash 
Signature reflector 20" heavy full crash 
Signature reflector 22" heavy full crash

References

Musicians from San Jose, California
Musicians from Ventura County, California
Living people
Unwritten Law members
American heavy metal drummers
American people of Italian descent
1969 births
Papa Roach members
20th-century American drummers
American male drummers